Skillet (formerly Skillet Street Food) is a Seattle gourmet burger van that specializes in bacon jam. It has been described as a restaurant on wheels. In October 2010, they announced they would be opening a diner in Seattle.

Skillet has been listed among America's top portable kitchens and is well known for their bacon jam. To create the consistency required for the jam, creator Josh Henderson focuses on the bacon fat and the reduced down vinegar and onion all cooking in one pot, which requires regular skimming. Skillet's jam has received a generally positive reception, with a flavor of pulled pork. A "Taste Test" review suggested "...the grilled cheese with bacon jam was the best-received Taste Test item in the feature’s storied history."

See also 

 List of New American restaurants

References

External links
 
 

Companies with year of establishment missing
Food trucks
New American restaurants in Washington (state)
Restaurant chains in the United States
Restaurants in Seattle